Eilean Glas is a peninsula of Scalpay in the Outer Hebrides, Scotland. Eilean Glas is home to a historic lighthouse. Eilean Glas means Grey/Green Island in Gaelic.

Geography

The island projects out considerably into The Minch shipping lane, which is likely why it was decided to place the Eilean Glas Lighthouse here. A track across the narrow isthmus connects Eilean Glas to Scalpay. More recently, a radio mast was erected on Eilean Glas.

Notes

Harris, Outer Hebrides
Landforms of the Outer Hebrides
Peninsulas of Scotland